Olsenella umbonata  is a variably Gram-positive, anaerobic and non-spore-forming bacterium from the genus of Olsenella which has been isolated from a sheep rumen and a pig jejunum.

References

 

Coriobacteriaceae
Bacteria described in 2011